The Durgas is a rock band founded in 2004 around the three brothers Benjii, Christopher, and Patrick Simmersbach, with influences of reggae and African and Eastern European folk elements over strains of Americana, folk and roots music and blues, without losing touch with the musicians' roots in punk and indie rock.

Background
Benjii Simmersbach (vocals, guitar) and Christopher Simmersbach (lead guitar) draw much of their musical influence from their childhood; both were born in Bavaria, Germany but raised in various parts of Thailand, Switzerland, Portugal, Tanzania, Mali, Senegal, Italy, France and the United States, as seen in the documentary film The Big Pink  (1994, ZDF/Arte, Grimme Award, 1996) on their hippie upbringing. The band's current, main constellation consist of Török Gabor (Hungary) on drums, and Katy J Arnovick (United States) on bass and vocals. Often their life performances feature: Orlando Smith (Hawaii) on drums, Murray Moceri (Sri Lanka) on bass, and Benjii and Christopher's older brother Patrick Simmersbach (Hawaii) on guitar. When not on tour their homes are in Los Angeles, Budapest and Hawaii respectively.

A Subtle Plague, 1984-1998
Founded 1984 in New York City, Adam Yauch of the Beastie Boys recorded A Subtle Plague's first demo. The brothers Simmersbach (with Benjii on bass and vocals and Christopher on percussion and guitar), Analucia DaSilva (vocals), Pat Ryan (vocals), third brother Patrick Simmersbach (guitar), changing drummers (including Earl Robertson, Vangie Bonds, Theo Denaxis, Sean Coffey, Tod Preuss and Magnus Fleischmann) and Jonathan Levy (percussion/saxophone) achieved wide notoriety as one of the best live bands in the U.S. underground, recording 7 albums, 3 singles and several compilations/split singles for various independent labels, including Rough Trade Records, Heyday Records, Grosse Rose Records, Harp Records and Trocadero Records.<ref>A Subtle Plague Discography on Discogs , </ref> Continuous European Tours followed, with an average of 125 concerts a year. They shared the stage with musicians such as Iggy Pop, Lou Reed, Mudhoney, Vic Chesnutt, Chumbawamba, Sister Double Happiness, Noir Désir, H-Blockx, The Notwist, The Jesus Lizard, Sonic Youth and Soul Asylum. Their communal way of touring and devoted fans led to Germany's Rolling Stone magazine calling A Subtle Plague "the Grateful Dead of the '90s". The end of the millennium brought the end of A Subtle Plague and a change towards the sounds of the folk and roots music of their upbringing.

A Drastic Measure, 1998-2003
After Pat Ryan and Analycia DaSilva left the band to pursue individual careers, Benjii switched to guitar and became singer of A Drastic Measure. Magnus and Maurus Fleischmann of Assassins of God and The Hedonist joined on drums and bass, then Jonathan Heine from Berlin joined the group on bass, Jonathan Levy re-joined as ambient sound master and a string of changing drummers followed. A Drastic Measure recorded High Frequency Recalibration (1999, self released) and Soul Of A Century (released by Thomas Bolenius in 2005) in San Francisco, engineered by Desmond Shea at Kevin Ink‘s The Studio That Time Forgot, produced by Fred Vidalenc (ex-bassist of Noir Désir) in Brittany, France. Among many guest musicians, the album features Michael Franti of Spearhead on vocals, Dan Carr of Preston School of Industry, The Court & Spark on bass, Tom Heyman of Go To Blazes and The Court and Spark on slide guitar, Mike Travers of Downhill Racers on keyboards, as well as Analucia DaSilva of A Subtle Plague on vocals. After Jonathan Levy moved to New York City and Patrick Simmersbach moved to settle in Hawaii A Drastic Measure changed their name to The Durgas.

Discography

Studio albums
In 2008 the Berlin label Cannery Row Records released The Durgas’ debut album Back To The Start  which was mixed by Boris Wilsdorf (producer of Einstürzende Neubauten), featuring guest musician Chuck Prophet.

The Durgas' album Burma was recorded in Berlin and was self released in 2010. Produced by Noa Winter Lazerus  (The Rolling Stones, Tom Waits, Pink Floyd) in Los Angeles and featuring Jim Fairchild (Grandaddy, Modest Mouse) on two tracks, the album signifies the group's most pop-oriented sound to date and alludes to the struggle of a nation in transition.

In Spring of 2014 The Durgas self-released their self-produced album Digging In The Fire.

Live albums
The Durgas' live album Make Some Noise  was recorded 2009 in Hawaii.

Soundtracks
The Durgas' music has been featured on several film soundtracks including Soul Of A Century  (Premio EuroDoc award 2002 for best European documentary) and the documentary film Hotel Sahara. They scored and composed original music for Into the Current: Burma’s Political Prisoners , a documentary film by Jeanne Hallacy; the film was nominated at the 2012 Santa Barbara Human Rights Film Festival.

Awards
The Durgas' song 'Send The Wind', on their record Digging In The Fire'', was among the top 10 music finalists of the World Citizen Artist 2014 competition by World Citizen Artists along with Playing for Change Foundation, Belgravia Gallery and issuu, and The Durgas have been named Ethics Advisors and Ambassadors for World Citizen Artists.

Commitment

Music In Aktion
Besides their extensive, international tours, The Durgas are committed to bringing a unifying musical experience to challenged communities around the world. In 2003 they were the first international band to play in Mitrovica, Kosovo since the Balkan Wars, as part of the ongoing United Nations peace and reunification initiative. In 2004 they took part in the XV International AIDS/HIV Conference in Bangkok, Thailand and performed in AIDS hospitals and orphanages. In 2007 they played to children of migrant workers in Mumbai, India, in Sri Lanka to families displaced by the Tsunami, in Thailand at the Saphan Jai festival, and for Burmese refugees in camps along the Thai border. Having witnessed firsthand the positive effects that live music can bring about in people across barriers of culture and language, they have been crucial in founding the non-profit Music In Aktion, which has been supported by U.S. Campaign for Burma, Save the Children, the German children's foundation WeltKinderLachen, human rights activist Jack Healey and Michael Franti of Spearhead.

References

External links
 Official website
 A Subtle Plague ‘I Separate’ on Youtube
 The Durgas live at Musiques En Stock Festival (F), 2010
 Christoph, Ralph (1995). "A Subtle Plague: Playing in the Band". SPEX. Mai 1995: Page 18-19.
 A Subtle Plague demo review on Threateningsociety.com, originally published: Issue #4, circa 1987

Musical groups established in 2004